was a town located in Santō District, Niigata Prefecture, Japan.

As of 2003, the town had an estimated population of 7,380 and a density of 368.08 persons per km². The total area was 20.05 km².

On January 1, 2006, Yoita, along with the city of Tochio, the town of Teradomari, and the village of Washima (all from Santō District), was merged into the expanded city of Nagaoka.

Transportation

Railway
Echigo Kotsu Nagaoka Line(:ja:越後交通長岡線) had been operated in the town until 1975.

Highway

See also
 Yoita Domain

Dissolved municipalities of Niigata Prefecture
Nagaoka, Niigata